The Piano Sonata in C-sharp minor D. 655 is a piano sonata written by Franz Schubert.

Movements
The sonata is incomplete, consisting of only a single movement, and even that was abandoned by the composer before completion.  Other hands, such as Howard Ferguson and Noël Lee, have attempted to realise Schubert's assumed intentions.

The single fragmentary movement is in C-sharp minor and is in sonata form, breaking off at the end of the exposition. Schubert uses a three-key exposition, with a first subject group in the tonic and then a second subject group, first in E major (the relative major) and then G-sharp major (the dominant major). Unusually, the second subject group is over four times as long as the first.

References

Sources
 

Piano sonatas by Franz Schubert
Compositions in C-sharp minor